Apostolepis cerradoensis is a species of snake in the family Colubridae. It is endemic to Brazil.

References 

albicollaris
Reptiles described in 2003
Reptiles of Brazil